Clarence Wilson may refer to:

Clarence Wilson (actor) (1876–1941), American actor
Clarence Remus Wilson, early 20th-century American musician, who played Old-time music